The gazeta (plural , , plural ) was a currency issued in the Ionian Islands in 1801 during the Russia and the Ottoman Empire protectorate. It replaced the Venetian lira at a rate of 1 gazeta = 2 soldi, and continued to be used through the existence of the Septinsular Republic. After the British took possession of the islands, coins were countermarked in Turkish kuruş for use on the islands before the obol was introduced in 1819 for the United States of the Ionian Islands.

External links

 Online Coin Club / Coins from Septinsular Republic

Currencies of Greece
Modern obsolete currencies
Gazeta
1801 establishments in Europe
1819 disestablishments in Europe
19th-century economic history
19th-century establishments in Greece
Septinsular Republic